Christmas, Like a Lullaby is the 24th studio album by American singer-songwriter John Denver released in December 1990.

This was Denver's first solo Christmas album of music since 1975's Rocky Mountain Christmas.  He also released the collaborative Christmas album A Christmas Together in 1979 with The Muppets.

The only original track was the title track "Christmas Like A Lullaby" written by Denver. The rest were Christmas carols and standards and two Tom Paxton songs, "The Children Of Bethlehem" and "Marvelous Toy".

Track listing

Side one
 "Christmas, Like a Lullaby" - 3:52
 "The First Noel" - 2:16
 "Away in a Manger" - 3:36
 "The Children of Bethlehem" - 3:31
 "Jingle Bells" - 2:43
 "White Christmas" - 2:37

Side two
 "Marvelous Toy" - 2:52
 "Blue Christmas" - 3:25
 "Rudolph, the Red-Nosed Reindeer" - 3:12
 "Little Drummer Boy" - 3:22
 "Mary's Little Boy Child" - 3:20
 "The Christmas Song (Chestnuts Roasting On An Open Fire)" - 4:05
 "Have Yourself a Merry Little Christmas" - 2:15

There is a 1999 reissue by Delta Entertainment.

Personnel
John Denver – acoustic guitar, vocals
James Burton – electric guitar
Glen Hardin – keyboards
Jim Horn – saxophone, flute, recorder
Jerry Carrigan – drums
Jerry Scheff – bass
Machito Sanchez – percussion

References

1990 Christmas albums
Christmas albums by American artists
John Denver albums
Albums produced by Roger Nichols (recording engineer)
Folk Christmas albums